The following are important identities involving derivatives and integrals in vector calculus.

Operator notation

Gradient

For a function  in three-dimensional Cartesian coordinate variables, the gradient is the vector field:

where i, j, k are the standard unit vectors for the x, y, z-axes. More generally, for a function of n variables , also called a scalar field, the gradient is the vector field:

where  are orthogonal unit vectors in arbitrary directions.  

As the name implies, the gradient is proportional to and points in the direction of the function's most rapid (positive) change.

For a vector field  written as a 1 × n row vector, also called a tensor field of order 1, the gradient or covariant derivative is the n × n Jacobian matrix:

For a tensor field  of any order k, the gradient  is a tensor field of order k + 1.

Divergence

In Cartesian coordinates, the divergence of a continuously differentiable vector field  is the scalar-valued function:

As the name implies the divergence is a measure of how much vectors are diverging. 

Specifically, the divergence of a vector is a scalar. The divergence of a higher order tensor field may be found by decomposing the tensor field into a sum of outer products and using the identity,

where  is the directional derivative in the direction of  multiplied by its magnitude. Specifically, for the outer product of two vectors,

Curl

In Cartesian coordinates, for  the curl is the vector field:

where i, j, and k are the unit vectors for the x-, y-, and z-axes, respectively. 

As the name implies the curl is a measure of how much nearby vectors tend in a circular direction.

In Einstein notation, the vector field  has curl given by:

where  = ±1 or 0 is the Levi-Civita parity symbol.

Laplacian

In Cartesian coordinates, the Laplacian of a function  is

The Laplacian is a measure of how much a function is changing over a small sphere centered at the point.

For a tensor field, the Laplacian is generally written as:

and is a tensor field of the same order.

When the Laplacian is equal to 0, the function is called a harmonic function. That is,

Special notations
In Feynman subscript notation,

where the notation ∇B  means the subscripted gradient operates on only the factor B.

Less general but similar is the Hestenes overdot notation in geometric algebra. The above identity is then expressed as:

where overdots define the scope of the vector derivative. The dotted vector, in this case B, is differentiated, while the (undotted) A is held constant.

For the remainder of this article, Feynman subscript notation will be used where appropriate.

First derivative identities

Distributive properties

Product rule for multiplication by a scalar 
We have the following generalizations of the product rule in single variable calculus.

In the second formula, the transposed gradient  is an n × 1 column vector,  is a 1 × n row vector, and their product is an  n × n  matrix (or more precisely, a dyad); This may also be considered as the tensor product  of two vectors, or of a covector and a vector.

Quotient rule for division by a scalar

Chain rule
Let  be a one-variable function from scalars to scalars,  a parametrized curve, and  a function from vectors to scalars. We have the following special cases of the multi-variable chain rule.

For a coordinate parametrization  we have:

Dot product rule

where  denotes the Jacobian matrix of the vector field .

Alternatively, using Feynman subscript notation,

See these notes. 

As a special case, when ,

The generalization of the dot product formula to Riemannian manifolds is a defining property of a Riemannian connection, which differentiates a vector field to give a vector-valued 1-form.

Cross product rule

Note that the matrix  is antisymmetric.

Second derivative identities

Divergence of curl is zero
The divergence of the curl of any continuously twice-differentiable vector field A is always zero:

This is a special case of the vanishing of the square of the exterior derivative in the De Rham chain complex.

Divergence of gradient is Laplacian
The Laplacian of a scalar field is the divergence of its gradient:

The result is a scalar quantity.

Divergence of divergence is not defined
Divergence of a vector field A is a scalar, and you cannot take the divergence of a scalar quantity. Therefore:

Curl of gradient is zero

The curl of the gradient of any continuously twice-differentiable scalar field  (i.e., differentiability class ) is always the zero vector:

It can be easily proved by expressing  in a Cartesian coordinate system with Schwarz's theorem (also called Clairaut's theorem on equality of mixed partials). This result is a special case of the vanishing of the square of the exterior derivative in the De Rham chain complex.

Curl of curl

Here ∇2 is the vector Laplacian operating on the vector field A.

Curl of divergence is not defined
The divergence of a vector field A is a scalar, and you cannot take curl of a scalar quantity. Therefore

A mnemonic 
The figure to the right is a mnemonic for some of these identities. The abbreviations used are:
 D: divergence,
 C: curl,
 G: gradient,
 L: Laplacian,
 CC: curl of curl.

Each arrow is labeled with the result of an identity, specifically, the result of applying the operator at the arrow's tail to the operator at its head. The blue circle in the middle means curl of curl exists, whereas the other two red circles (dashed) mean that DD and GG do not exist.

Summary of important identities

Differentiation

Gradient

Divergence

Curl

Vector dot Del Operator

Second derivatives

        (scalar Laplacian)
   (vector Laplacian)
 

 (Green's vector identity)

Third derivatives

Integration
Below, the curly symbol ∂ means "boundary of" a surface or solid.

Surface–volume integrals
In the following surface–volume integral theorems, V denotes a three-dimensional volume with a corresponding two-dimensional boundary S = ∂V (a closed surface):

 
   (divergence theorem)
 
  (Green's first identity)
   (Green's second identity)
   (integration by parts)
   (integration by parts)
   (integration by parts)

Curve–surface integrals
In the following curve–surface integral theorems, S denotes a 2d open surface with a corresponding 1d boundary C = ∂S (a closed curve):

  (Stokes' theorem)

Integration around a closed curve in the clockwise sense is the negative of the same line integral in the counterclockwise sense (analogous to interchanging the limits in a definite integral):

Endpoint-curve integrals

  (Gradient theorem).

See also

References

Further reading

 
 
 

Mathematical identities
Mathematics-related lists
Vector calculus

eo:Vektoraj identoj
zh:向量恆等式列表